Fred, Freddie or Frederick Stewart may refer to:

Businessmen
Frederick Charles Stewart (1879-1950), Scottish electrical engineer, industrialist

Noblemen, politicians and public servants
Frederick Stewart, 1st Lord Pittenweem (c.1590–1625), Scottish nobleman first bearer of title Lord Pittenweem
Frederick Stewart, 4th Marquess of Londonderry (1805–1872), Anglo-Irish nobleman and minor politician
Frederick Stewart (colonial administrator) (1836–1889), Scottish Colonial Secretary in Hong Kong
Fred E. Stewart (c.1881–1942), American tax administrator in California from 1926 to 1942
Frederick Stewart (Australian politician) (1884–1961), Australian businessman, politician and government minister
Sir Frederick Stewart (geologist) (1916–2001), Scottish geologist, academic and government advisor
Fred Stewart (Alberta politician) (born 1934), Canadian member of Legislative Assembly of Alberta

Performers
Frederick Stewart, English baritone on 1917 recording of Elgar's The Fringes of the Fleet#Recordings
Fred Stewart (actor) (1906–1970), American TV and film actor in 1961's Splendor in the Grass
Freddie Stewart (actor) (1921–2000), American film actor and singer
Freddie Stone Stewart (born 1947), American guitarist and vocalist, co-founder of Sly and the Family Stone

Sportsmen
Fred Stewart (football manager) (1872–1954), English manager of Stockport County and Cardiff City
Fred Stewart (Australian footballer) (1875–1941), Australian with St Kilda in VFL

Writers
Fred W. Stewart (1894–1991), American surgical pathologist and author of medical texts
Fred Mustard Stewart (1932–2007), American novelist
Fred Stewart (bridge) (born 1948), American bridge player and author

See also
Frederick Stuart (disambiguation)